Varvara Maksimovna Subbotina (born 21 March 2001) is a Russian synchronised swimmer.

In 2018, Subbotina and Svetlana Kolesnichenko won the gold medal in both the duet technical routine and duet free routine at the 2018 European Aquatics Championships.

References

2001 births
Living people
Russian synchronized swimmers
World Aquatics Championships medalists in synchronised swimming
Artistic swimming at the 2019 World Aquatics Championships
European Aquatics Championships medalists in synchronised swimming
Swimmers from Moscow